UBN may refer to:

Chinggis Khaan International Airport, near Ulaanbataar, Mongolia
Unbinilium, chemical element with the symbol Ubn
Union Bank of Nigeria, a commercial bank headquartered in Lagos, Nigeria
Union for a New Burkina, a political party in Burkina Faso
Unique Business News, a news channel in Taiwan
United Blood Nation, an American prison gang
United Biscuits Network, a radio network for United Biscuits
Unity Broadcasting Network, a religious television network in the United States